Round the Wheel is the third release by Colorado-based jam band The String Cheese Incident, released in 1998. The album features guests Paul McCandless on soprano and tenor saxophone and Tony Furtado on banjo.

Track listing 
 "Samba DeGreeley"  (Michael Travis) – 0:42  
 "Come as You Are"  (Michael Kang) – 6:38  
 "Restless Wind"  (Bill Nershi) – 3:47  
 "On the Road"  (Bill Nershi) – 3:55  
 "Road Home"  (Bill Nershi) – 5:06  
 "Galactic"  (Kyle Hollingsworth, Michael Kang) – 7:13  
 "100 Year Flood"  (Bill Nershi) – 6:09  
 "MLT"  (Kyle Hollingsworth) – 6:24  
 "Got What He Wanted"  (Kyle Hollingsworth) – 4:27  
 Round the Wheel"  (Bill Nershi) – 7:25  
 "Good Times Around the Bend"  (Bill Nershi) – 3:26

Credits

The String Cheese Incident 
 Bill Nershi – Acoustic Guitar
 Keith Moseley – Bass guitar
 Kyle Hollingsworth – Accordion, Organ, Piano, Fender Rhodes
 Michael Kang– Mandolin, Violin 
 Michael Travis – percussion, Conga, drums, Timbales, Diembe, Talking Drum

Additional Personnel 
 Tony Furtado – Banjo 
 Paul McCandless – Soprano Saxophone, Tenor Saxophone, Sopranino
 Christian Teal – percussion
 Yvonne Brown – Background Vocals  
 Coco Brown – Background Vocals

Production 
 Ken Love – Mastering 
 James Tuttle – Engineer 
 The String Cheese Incident – Producer 
 Michael R. Everett – Cover Art 
 Greg Heimbecker – Engineer 
 Jon O'Leary – Producer

References

The String Cheese Incident albums
1998 albums
SCI Fidelity Records albums